Sapas may refer to:

Sapas, a Canaanite goddess
Sapas Mons, a volcano on Venus
Sapas (crater), a crater on Ganymede